Simeon Mulama (born 6 August 1980) is a Kenyan retired footballer who played as a midfielder.

Career 
Born in Nairobi, Mulama began his early career in his native Kenya with Mathare United and AFC Leopards; he was captain at the former. He later played in Egypt for Ismaily, in the United States for Park University, and in Sweden for Skellefteå FF. He returned to Mathare United in 2009.

Mulama earned eleven caps for the Kenyan national side, and appeared in one FIFA World Cup qualifying match.

Personal life
He is the twin brother of fellow player Titus Mulama.

References

1980 births
Living people
Kenyan twins
Twin sportspeople
Kenyan footballers
Association football midfielders
Mathare United F.C. players
A.F.C. Leopards players
Ismaily SC players
Skellefteå FF players
Kenya international footballers
Kenyan expatriate footballers
Kenyan expatriate sportspeople in Sweden
Kenyan expatriate sportspeople in Egypt
Kenyan expatriate sportspeople in the United States
Expatriate footballers in Sweden
Expatriate footballers in Egypt
Expatriate soccer players in the United States